was a town located in Kaizu District, Gifu Prefecture, Japan.

As of 2003, the town had an estimated population of 17,268 and a density of 333.29 persons per km². The total area was 51.81 km².

On March 28, 2005, Nannō was merged with the towns of Kaizu (former) and Hirata (all from Kaizu District), to create the city of Kaizu.

Notes

External links
Kaizu official website 

Dissolved municipalities of Gifu Prefecture
Kaizu